Coma is a five-part series co-produced by two South Korean firms, SIO Film and OCN.  It is a horror-mystery film set in a hospital that is being shut down due to its dubious practices.

It was shown at the 7th Jeonju International Film Festival in 2006.

Cast
Lee Se-eun as Yoon Young
Myung Ji-yeon as Nurse Kang Soo-jin
Lee Jung-heon as Doctor Jang Seo-won
Im Won-hee as Detective Choi
Lee Young-jin as Hong-ah
Cha Soo-yeon as Lee So-hee
Jung Jae-jin as Director
Bae So-yeon as Hye-young
Jung Bo-hoon as Nurse Han Myung-sook
Han Tae-il as janitor
Lee Ye-rim as Joo-hee
Oh Tae-kyung
 Kim Byung-chul

Technical notes
Directors:  Kong Su-chang (supervising director), Cho Kyu-oak, Yoo Jun-suk, and Kim Jeong-gu

Running time is just over four hours.

One DVD set has the original Korean-language sound-track and optional Korean and English subtitles. There are many dubbed versions of the film, including Cambodian. It is also sold in a version with English, Chinese, Japanese, and Korean subtitles.

References

External links
 http://eng.jiff.or.kr/program/film_eng.php?no=101#
 https://web.archive.org/web/20070707230547/http://shop.hkdvdstore.com/product_info.php/cPath/34/products_id/26141

Horror fiction television series
Korean-language television shows
2006 in South Korean television
OCN television dramas
South Korean mystery television series